Sandy Anderson was a Scottish curler. He was the second man on the team that represented Scotland at the 1962 Scotch Cup, the world men's curling championship at the time. He and the team of skip Willie Young, third John Pearson, and lead Bobby Young curled out of the Airth Bruce Castle and Dunmore Curling Club in Falkirk, Scotland.

References

External links
 
 

 Video:
 
 

Scottish male curlers
Scottish curling champions
Year of birth missing
Place of birth missing